Rags is a nickname for:

People
Rags Faircloth (1892–1953), Major League Baseball pitcher
John Kelly (rugby union, born 1974) (born 1974), Irish retired rugby union footballer
Rags Matthews (1905–1999), All-American football player
Rags Morales, American comic book artist
Clare Raglan (1927–2002), Canadian National Hockey League player
Rags Ragland (1905–1946), American character actor
Sébastien Raguin (born 1980), French rugby league player
Dave Righetti (born 1958), American Major League Baseball retired pitcher
Ravi Khote, an Indian singer

Other uses
New York Rangers (1926–present), National Hockey League team

See also
 Rag (disambiguation)

Lists of people by nickname